Trombidium breei is a species of red mite in the genus Trombidium in the family Trombidiidae. It is found in Europe. The larvae are parasites/hosts of certain butterflies (Lepidoptera), particularly meadow brown (Maniola jurtina), gatekeeper (Pyronia tithonus), marbled white (Melanargia galathea), common blue (Polyommatus icarus) and small skipper (Thymelicus sylvestris). They attach themselves to the thorax or legs of the butterfly and transfer from host to host when the butterflies alight to nectar at flowers.

References
 Synopsis of the described Arachnida of the World: Trombidiidae

Name
The species is named after Reverend William Thomas Bree (1754–1822).

Further reading

Trombidiidae
Animals described in 1986
Arachnids of Europe